Darren Foreman (born 12 February 1968) is an English former footballer.

He played for Fareham Town, Barnsley, Crewe Alexandra and Scarborough. Foreman is Scarborough's all-time top goalscorer in the Football League with 35 goals, 27 of which were scored in the 1992–93 season. He was forced to quit the professional game in 1995 because of injury. After the end of his professional career, he played for several non-league clubs, including Gateshead, Guiseley, and Barrow, before rejoining Scarborough to serve in a number of non-playing roles. He also played 22 games (12 goals) for IK Sirius, Uppsala in Sweden in 1995.

He is now a paramedic, in the Scarborough area.

Honours
Individual
PFA Team of the Year: 1992–93 Third Division

References

1968 births
Living people
Footballers from Southampton
English footballers
Association football forwards
Barnsley F.C. players
Crewe Alexandra F.C. players
Scarborough F.C. players
Gateshead F.C. players
Barrow A.F.C. players
English Football League players
Fareham Town F.C. players
IK Sirius Fotboll players
Sportspeople from Scarborough, North Yorkshire
Guiseley A.F.C. players